Ewell is a village in Surrey, England.

Ewell may also refer to:

Places
Ewell, Alabama
Ewell, Kansas
Ewell, Maryland
Ewell, Virginia

Other uses
Ewell (name)

See also
Epsom and Ewell, a local government district
Epsom and Ewell (UK Parliament constituency)
Epsom & Ewell F.C., football club
Ewell Castle School
Ewell East railway station
Ewell West railway station
Ewell Minnis, a village in Kent
Temple Ewell, a village in Kent